Reynella East is a metropolitan suburb of Adelaide, South Australia. It lies within the City of Onkaparinga and has postcode 5161.  It is one of the smallest suburbs in South Australia.

History

References

Suburbs of Adelaide